Ita Daly (born 1945) is an Irish author of five novels for adults, two for children and a collection of short stories.

Biography
Ita Daly was born in 1945 in Drumshanbo, County Leitrim, Ireland. She was the daughter of a civil servant. She was educated in the St Louis High School, Rathmines, Dublin and then went on to study English and Spanish at University College Dublin. She graduated with a Bachelor of Arts, Master of Arts and Higher Diploma in Education. She worked as a teacher for eleven years at a secondary school in Dublin.

Daly was married to writer David Marcus and in 2016 published a memoir of their life together, I'll Drop You a Line: A Life With David Marcus. She has one daughter. She left teaching when her daughter was born. She lives in Dublin.

She is a member of Aosdána.

Awards
 In both 1972 and 1976 she was awarded the Hennessy Literary Award
 In 1975 she won the short story contest in The Irish Times

Bibliography
 The Lady with the Red Shoes (1980)
 Ellen (1986)
 A Singular Attraction (1987)
 Candy on the Dart (1989)
 Candy and Sharon Olé (1991)
 Dangerous Fictions (1991)
 All Fall Down (1992)
 Unholy ghosts (2000)
 Irish Myths & Legends (2000)
 We Were Happy There: A Hundred Years of St Louis High School Rathmines (2014)
 I'll Drop You a Line: A Life With David Marcus (2016)

References 

1945 births
Living people
Irish women novelists
People from County Leitrim
Writers from Dublin (city)
Aosdána members
Irish women children's writers
Irish children's writers
Collectors of fairy tales
Women folklorists
Alumni of University College Dublin